The Fiancés is a 1963 Italian film directed by Ermanno Olmi. It tells the story of a young man who moves to Sicily for a job, but pines for his fiancée back home. It was entered into the 1963 Cannes Film Festival.

Plot
Giovanni quits his job as a worker in Milan and leaves his fiancée Liliana in order to earn more money as a welder in Sicily.

Selected cast
 Carlo Cabrini - Giovanni
 Anna Canzi - Liliana

References

External links
 
 
I fidanzati: Rhapsody in the Rain an essay by Kent Jones at the Criterion Collection

1963 films
Italian black-and-white films
1960s Italian-language films
1963 romantic drama films
Films directed by Ermanno Olmi
Films set in Sicily
Films shot in Sicily
1960s Italian films